Rhys Toms (aka Black Summer) is an Australian music producer and DJ. He is best known for being discovered on Triple J Unearthed and for performing at major Australian music festivals Groovin' the Moo, Summernats, and Nickelodeon Slimefest.

Early life and education 
Toms began making his own electronic music at the age of eight, citing inspiration from Skrillex, Will.i.am, Martin Garrix, Avicii, and Flume. He set up a home studio in his father's office and uploaded three tracks to Triple J Unearthed. One of his debut tracks, "Toxic Nirvana", was accompanied by a stop-motion music video made with Lego.

He lives in Canberra, Australia, with his parents Rick and Nicola Toms. When Triple J Unearthed discovered him at the age of 11, he attended Maribyrnong Primary School in Kaleen, Australia. He began high school in 2016.

Career 
In February 2015, Toms was discovered by Australian radio station Triple J Unearthed. He then appeared in a mini-documentary for Triple J about musicians in regional Australia. The documentary went viral, accruing more than 2 million views. New World Artists signed Toms, and he began producing music professionally under his DJ alias Black Summer.

Toms played his first DJ set at Groovin' the Moo in 2015 to an audience of 10,000 people, where he garnered attention from multiple media outlets as well as support from Nina Las Vegas, Canadian house producer Deadmau5, and Australian musician Flume. He then performed at Nickelodeon's Slimefest in Sydney and Melbourne alongside magician Cosentino, Savage, At Sunset, Samantha Jade, and YouTube Stars Boyce Avenue; and at Summernats 2016 alongside Seth Sentry, Hoodoo Gurus, You Am I,  and Brooke Evers.

In 2016, he was invited to speak on a panel for Indent music conference in Sydney in 2016, appeared on Network Ten's The Project in 2016, and was featured as the face of the Uncle Toby's Oats campaign "The Unexpected Maestro".

In 2017, the music video for "Young Like Me" by Black Summer feat. Lowell (directed by Tim Maxx) launched on national television in Australia on Nine Network. The music video was filmed in Los Angeles. Toms has been accused by many online commentators that this song (among some others) has been ghost-produced as well as the music videos being viewbotted. In November of that same year, he also headlined a set at The Wall in Sydney's Kings Cross.

Toms collaborated with Grammy Award–winning Australian music producer and sound engineer Chris 'Tek' O'Ryan on his first EP album. In 2018, he released a new song called “Sadness” with Chloe Campbell, a young artist from The Bahamas. The track was recorded at Tekzen Studio in Los Angeles and was refined at Gullible Burger Studio in Canberra, Australia.

In 2018, Toms announced he was working on a hip hop and beats EP featuring both US and Australian rappers that was set for release in late 2018 or early 2019. He released the aforementioned EP, Big Dreams, in 2019; he produced another EP, Miami Beach, in 2020. Later in 2020, Toms released his album YeH, which included "Blender".

Singles discography

References

External links 
 Black Summer on SoundCloud
 Black Summer on Triple J Unearthed

Australian DJs
Living people
Child musicians
Australian record producers
Year of birth missing (living people)